The Alpha Rho Chi Fraternity House is a historic fraternity house located at the University of Illinois at Urbana–Champaign in Champaign, Illinois. Its resident fraternity was one of the two founding chapters of Alpha Rho Chi; it formed as the Arcus Society in 1911 and became the Anthemios chapter of Alpha Rho Chi in 1914. The fraternity's members were all students in architecture or a related field; its name came from the first three letters in the Greek word for architecture, and the chapter's namesake was a famous Greek architect. The fraternity's house, designed in 1928 by local architecture firm Royer, Danley, and Smith, is itself a notable architectural work. The building blends elements of the French Eclectic and English Arts and Crafts styles; significant details include the corner tower over its arched entrance, brick chimneys at the narrow ends of its "L"-shaped plan, decorative brickwork, and a steep tile hip roof.

The house was added to the National Register of Historic Places on May 23, 1997.

References

Residential buildings on the National Register of Historic Places in Illinois
Houses completed in 1928
National Register of Historic Places in Champaign County, Illinois
Buildings and structures of the University of Illinois Urbana-Champaign
Fraternity and sorority houses
Buildings and structures in Champaign, Illinois